Blacks and Blues is the third studio album by American jazz flutist Bobbi Humphrey. The album was recorded in 1973 and released on the Blue Note label.

Reception
The Allmusic review by Steve Huey awarded the album 4½ stars stating "Bobbi Humphrey scored her biggest hit with her third album Blacks and Blues, an utterly delightful jazz-funk classic that helped make her a sensation at Montreux... Overall, the album's cumulative effect is like a soft summer breeze, perfect for beaches, barbecues, and cruising with the top down".

Track listing
All compositions by Larry Mizell
 "Chicago, Damn" - 6:31 
 "Harlem River Drive" - 7:50 
 "Just a Love Child" - 6:34 
 "Blacks and Blues" - 4:37 
 "Jasper Country Man" - 5:14 
 "Baby's Gone" - 8:48 
Recorded at The Sound Factory, Los Angeles, California on June 6, 7 & 8, 1973

Personnel
Bobbi Humphrey - flute, vocals
Jerry Peters - piano, electric piano
Fonce Mizell - clavinet, trumpet, vocals
Freddie Perren - synthesizer, vocals
David T. Walker - guitar
Chuck Rainey - electric bass
Harvey Mason  - drums
Stephanie Spruill - percussion
Chuck Davis - vocals
Larry Mizell - vocals, arranger, conductor

References 

Blue Note Records albums
Bobbi Humphrey albums
1973 albums
Albums produced by the Mizell Brothers
Jazz-funk albums